Mohan Kumar Raja (born 14 December 1996) is an Indian sprinter who was part of India's six-member 4 × 400 metres relay team at the 2016 Summer Olympics.

References

External links
Rio Olympics 2016 

1996 births
Living people
Indian male sprinters
Athletes from Tamil Nadu
Sportspeople from Chennai